Navia de Suarna is a municipality in Lugo province in Galicia in north-west Spain.

Municipalities in the Province of Lugo